The fifth cholera pandemic (1881–1896) was the fifth major international outbreak of cholera in the 19th century. It spread throughout Asia and Africa, and reached parts of France, Germany, Russia, and South America. It claimed 200,000 lives in Russia between 1893 and 1894; and 90,000 in Japan between 1887 and 1889. The 1892 outbreak in Hamburg, Germany was the biggest European outbreak; about 8,600 people died in that city. Although many residents held the city government responsible for the virulence of the epidemic (leading to cholera riots in 1893), it continued with practices largely unchanged. This was the last serious European cholera outbreak of the century.

Pope Leo XIII authorized the construction of a hospice inside the Vatican for afflicted residents of nearby Roman neighbourhoods. That building was torn down in 1996 to make way for construction of the Domus Sanctae Marthae.

The events surrounding the cholera pandemic in Bologna in 1855 were described by the city's Sanitation Department or Delegation, published in 1857. The treatise also describes prior plagues afflicting the city.

Scientific debate
During the pandemic, Robert Koch isolated Vibrio cholerae and proposed postulates to explain how bacteria caused disease. His work helped to establish the germ theory of disease.

Prior to this time, many physicians believed the disease was caused by direct exposure to the products of filth and decay. Koch helped establish that the disease was more specifically contagious and was transmitted by exposure to the feces of an infected person, including through contaminated water supply.

Mark Twain
American author Mark Twain, an avid traveler, visited Hamburg during the cholera outbreak, and he described his experience in a short, uncollected piece dated "1891–1892". Therein, he notes alarmingly the lack of information in Hamburg newspapers about the cholera event, particularly death totals. He also criticizes the treatment of the poor, as many, Twain says, were getting "snatched from their homes to the pest houses", where "a good many of them ... die unknown and are buried so". Twain concludes by lamenting the lack of awareness worldwide, especially in America.

See also
 Cholera outbreaks and pandemics

References

Further reading
 
 Richard J. Evans. Death in Hamburg: Society and Politics in the Cholera Years 1830–1910. Penguin Books, 2005. 

Cholera pandemics
19th-century epidemics
1880s disease outbreaks
1890s disease outbreaks